Xhelal Juka (5 April 1926 – 7 February 2012) was an Albanian footballer who played for Vllaznia. He featured once for the Albania national football team in 1946, scoring two goals.

Career statistics

International

International goals
Scores and results list Albania's goal tally first, score column indicates score after each Albania goal.

References

1926 births
2012 deaths
Albanian footballers
Albania international footballers
Association football forwards